This is a list of Municipalities and their suburbs (neighbourhoods), townships, and rural localities in the greater metropolitan area of Melbourne, Victoria, Australia. Suburbs are defined here as localities within the legislated Urban Growth Boundary, all of which have some urban development. This line is the effective boundary of suburban Melbourne; outside it lie rural areas, and some townships of varying size.

Each suburb is followed by its postcode. Some suburbs share the same postcode.

Indented entries are recognised by the Geographic Names Board as unbounded neighbourhoods except when italicised. Those italicised usually have, or have had, Post Offices open under that name.

Information about exact suburb boundaries can be obtained from the Department of Environment Land Water and Planning.

In Australia, a suburb is a named and bounded locality of a city, with an urban nature, regardless of its location within that city. The term "inner suburbs" refers to the older, denser, urban areas closer to the original colonial centre of the cities and "outer suburbs" refers to the urban areas more remote from the centre of the metropolitan area. Sometimes the term "middle ring suburb" is used to refer to areas that were urbanised early in a city's expansion after the inner suburbs had become established. This differs from British and North American usage, in which the term "suburb" is usually not applied to urban areas (neighbourhoods) that are close to a major city centre or inside the central city's local government boundary.

Inner City municipalities and their suburbs (followed by their 4-digit postcodes)

City of Melbourne
 Carlton 3053
 Carlton South
 Carlton North 3054 (Shared with City of Yarra)
 Docklands 3008
 East Melbourne 3002
 Jolimont (the name of the railway station)
 Flemington 3031 (Shared with City of Moonee Valley)
 Kensington 3031
 Melbourne 3000 (Central business district)
 Melbourne 3004 (St Kilda Road area, shared with City of Port Phillip)
 North Melbourne 3051 (Shared with City of Moonee Valley)
 Hotham Hill
 Macaulay (the name of the railway station)
 Parkville 3052
Royal Park
 Port Melbourne 3207 (Shared with City of Port Phillip)
 Fishermans Bend (formerly Fishermen's Bend)
Garden City
 Southbank 3006 (Shared with City of Port Phillip)
 South Wharf 3006
 South Yarra 3141 (Shared with City of Stonnington)
 West Melbourne 3003
 Coode Island

See Melbourne central business district for precincts in the CBD.

City of Port Phillip
 Albert Park 3206
 Balaclava 3183
 Elwood 3184
 Brighton Road
 Melbourne 3004 (St Kilda Road area, shared with City of Melbourne)
 Albert Park Barracks
 Middle Park 3206
 Port Melbourne 3207 (Shared with City of Melbourne)
 Beacon Cove
 Fishermans Bend
 Garden City
 Graham (the name of the closed railway station)
 Sandridge, an earlier name for Port Melbourne
 Ripponlea 3185
 St Kilda 3182
 St Kilda South
 St Kilda East 3183 (Shared with City of Glen Eira)
 St Kilda West 3182
 St Kilda Junction
 Southbank 3006 (Shared with City of Melbourne)
 South Melbourne 3205
 City Road
 Emerald Hill
 Montague (the name of the closed railway station)
 South Wharf 3006 (Shared with City of Melbourne)

City of Yarra
 Abbotsford 3067
 Victoria Park (the name of the railway station)
 Alphington 3078 (Shared with City of Darebin) 
 Burnley 3121
 Carlton North 3054 (Shared with City of Melbourne)
 North Carlton
 Clifton Hill 3068
 Collingwood 3066
 Collingwood North
 Cremorne 3121
 Richmond East
 Fairfield 3078 (Shared with City of Darebin) 
 Yarra Bend
 Fitzroy 3065
 Eastern Hill
 Fitzroy South
 Fitzroy North 3068
 North Fitzroy
 Rushall (the name of the railway station)
 Princes Hill 3054
 Richmond 3121
 Burnley North
 North Richmond (the name of the railway station)
 Richmond South
 Victoria Gardens
 West Richmond (the name of the railway station)

Northern municipalities and their suburbs

City of Banyule
 Bellfield 3081
 Briar Hill 3088
 Bundoora 3083 (Shared with City of Darebin and City of Whittlesea)
 Greenwood Village
 Janefield
 Larundel
 Polaris
 Eaglemont 3084
 Eltham 3095 (Shared with Shire of Nillumbik)
 Eltham North 3095 (Shared with Shire of Nillumbik)
 Greensborough 3088 (Shared with Shire of Nillumbik)
 Apollo Parkways
 Grace Park
 Green Hills
 Heidelberg 3084
 Heidelberg Heights 3081
 Heidelberg North
 Heidelberg West 3081
 Ivanhoe 3079
 Darebin (the name of the railway station)
 Fairy Hills
 Ivanhoe North
 Ivanhoe East 3079
 Lower Plenty 3093
 Macleod 3085 (Shared with City of Darebin)
 Mont Park
 Macleod West
 Montmorency 3094
 Rosanna 3084
 Banyule
 St Helena 3088
 Viewbank 3084
 Rosanna East
 Watsonia 3087
 Watsonia North 3087
 Yallambie 3085

City of Darebin
 Alphington 3078 (Shared with City of Yarra)
 Bundoora 3083 (Shared with City of Banyule and City of Whittlesea)
 Mount Cooper
 Coburg 3058 (Shared with City of Merri-bek)
 Coburg North 3058 (Shared with City of Merri-bek)
 Fairfield 3078 (Shared with City of Yarra)
 Kingsbury 3083
 Macleod 3085 (Shared with City of Banyule)
 Northcote 3070
 Croxton (the name of the railway station)
 Croxton East
 Dennis (the name of the railway station)
 Merri (the name of the railway station)
 Northcote South
 Rucker's Hill
 Westgarth (the name of the railway station)
 Preston 3072
 Bell (the name of the railway station)
 Darebin Park
 Gilberton
 Northland
 Preston Lake
 Preston West
 Regent (Shared with Reservoir) (the name of the railway station)
 Regent West
 South Preston
 Sylvester
 Reservoir 3073
 Gilbank
 Regent (Shared with Preston)
 Reservoir East
 Reservoir North
 Reservoir South
 Ruthven (the name of the railway station)
 Summerhill
 Thornbury 3071
 Pender
 Thornbury North

City of Hume

Suburbs
 Attwood 3049
 Broadmeadows 3047
 Broadmeadows South
 Broadmeadows Square
 Fentona
 Meadow Fair
 Campbellfield 3061
 Coolaroo 3048
 Craigieburn 3064
 Dallas 3047
 Upfield (the name of the railway station)
 Gladstone Park 3043
 Greenvale 3059
 Jacana 3047
 Keilor 3036 (Shared with City of Brimbank)
 Meadow Heights 3048
 Melbourne Airport 3045
 Roxburgh Park 3064
 Somerton 3062
 Tullamarine 3043 (Shared with City of Brimbank and City of Merri-bek)
 Westmeadows 3049
 Sunbury 3429 (Separate from the other suburbs) 
 Jacksons Hill
 Canterbury Hills
 Mount Holden
 Goonawarra
 Rupertswood (the name of the closed railway station)

Townships and rural localities
 Bulla 3428
 Clarkefield 3430 (Shared with Shire of Macedon Ranges)
 Lancefield Junction
 Diggers Rest 3427 (Shared with Shire of Melton)
 Kalkallo 3064
 Mickleham 3064
 Konagaderra Springs
 Oaklands Junction 3063
 Oaklands Park
 Wildwood 3429
 Yuroke 3063

City of Merri-bek

 Brunswick 3056
 Anstey (the name of the railway station)
 Brunswick Lake
 Brunswick North
 Jewell (the name of the railway station)
 Brunswick East 3057
 Lygon Street North
 Moreland East
 Sumner
 Brunswick West 3055
 Grantham Street
 Brunswick South
 Moonee Vale
 Moreland West
 Coburg 3058 (Shared with City of Darebin)
 Coburg East
 Moreland (the name of the railway station)
 Coburg North 3058 (Shared with City of Darebin)
 Merlynston (the name of the railway station)
 Newlands (Estate)
 Batman (the name of the railway station)
 Fawkner 3060
 Fawkner East
 Fawkner North
 Gowrie
 Moomba Park
 Glenroy 3046
 Westbreen
 Gowanbrae 3043
 Fern Ridge
 Willowbrook
 Hadfield 3046
 Oak Park 3046
 Pascoe Vale 3044
 Pascoe Vale South 3044
 Coonans Hill
 Tullamarine 3043 (Shared with City of Brimbank and City of Hume)

Shire of Nillumbik

Suburbs
 Diamond Creek 3089
 Eltham 3095
 Glen Park
 Eltham North 3095 (Shared with City of Banyule)
 Greensborough 3088 (a small area: Shared with City of Banyule)
 Hurstbridge 3099
 Midhurst
 North Warrandyte 3113
 Sloan Hill
 Plenty 3090
 Research 3095
 Wattle Glen 3096
 Balee, the original name of the railway station
 Diamond Creek Upper, a former name

Towns, townships and rural localities
 Bend of Islands 3097
 Christmas Hills 3775
 Rob Roy
 Cottles Bridge 3099
 Streamville
 Doreen 3754 (Shared with City of Whittlesea where there is suburban development)
 Kangaroo Ground 3097
 Kangaroo Ground South
 Pretty Hill
 Kinglake 3763 (Shared with Shire of Murrindindi)
 Dashville
 Mount Slide
 Kinglake West 3778 (Shared with City of Whittlesea and Shire of Murrindindi)
 Nutfield 3099
 Panton Hill 3759
 St Andrews 3761
 Mittons Bridge
 Queenstown
 Smiths Gully 3760
 Strathewen 3099
 Eagle Nest
 Watsons Creek 3097
 Yan Yean 3755 (Shared with City of Whittlesea)
 Yarrambat 3091
 Tan(c)ks Corner

City of Whittlesea

Suburbs
 Bundoora 3083 (Shared with City of Banyule and City of Darebin)
 Doreen 3754 (Shared with Shire of Nillumbik where it is a rural area)
 Hazel Glen
 Laurimar
 Linton Grange
 Yan Yean South
 Epping 3076
 Aurora
 Epping North
 Lalor 3075
 Lalor Plaza
 Mernda 3754
 Mill Park 3082
 South Morang 3752
 Thomastown 3074
 Keon Park (the name of the railway station)
 Wollert 3750

Towns, townships and rural localities
 Beveridge 3753 (Shared with Shire of Mitchell)
 Merriang
 Donnybrook 3064 (Shared with City of Hume)
 Eden Park 3757
 Humevale 3757
 Scrubby Creek
 Kinglake West 3778 (Shared with Shire of Nillumbik and Shire of Murrindindi) 
 Whittlesea 3757
 Bruces Creek
 Glenvale
 Tommys Hut
 Wallaby Creek
 Woodstock 3755
 Yan Yean 3755 (Shared with Shire of Nillumbik)

Eastern municipalities and their suburbs

City of Boroondara

 Ashburton 3147
 Alamein (the name of the railway station)
 Solway (in the south with a Post Office open 1954 to 1978)
 Balwyn 3103
 Balwyn East
 Stradbroke Park
 Balwyn North 3104
 Bellevue
 Fortuna
 Greythorn
 Trentwood
 Yooralla
 Camberwell 3124
 Camberwell North
 Camberwell South
 Camberwell West
 East Camberwell (the name of the railway station)
 Hartwell (the name of the railway station)
 Highfield Park
 Middle Camberwell
 Riversdale (the name of the railway station)
 Willison (the name of the railway station)
 Canterbury 3126
 Shenley
 Deepdene 3103
 Glen Iris 3146 (Shared with City of Stonnington)
 Hawthorn 3122
 Auburn South
 Barker (the name of the closed railway station)
 Glenferrie (the name of the railway station)
 Glenferrie South
 Hawthorn North
 Hawthorn West
 Hawthorn East 3123
 Auburn (the name of the railway station)
 Hawthorn South
 Upper Hawthorn
 Kew 3101
 Balwyn West
 Cotham
 Studley Park
 Willsmere
 Kew East 3102
 Harp
 Kew North
 Mont Albert 3127 (Shared with City of Whitehorse)
 Surrey Hills 3127 (Shared with City of Whitehorse)
 Chatham (the name of the railway station)
 Elgar Park
 Faversham

City of Knox
 Bayswater 3153
 Boronia 3155
 Ferntree Gully 3156
 Mountain Gate
 Knoxfield 3180
 Knox Park
 Lysterfield 3156 (shared Shire of Yarra Ranges)
 Rowville 3178
 Scoresby 3179
 Sassafras 3787
 The Basin 3154
 Upper Ferntree Gully 3156 (shared Shire of Yarra Ranges)
 Wantirna 3152
 Knox City Centre
 Wantirna South 3152
Studfield

City of Manningham

Suburbs
 Bulleen 3105
 Bulleen South
 Doncaster 3108
 Doncaster Hill
 Waldau (Shared with Doncaster East)
 Doncaster East 3109
 Doncaster Heights
 The Pines, shopping centre
 Tunstall Square
 Waldau (Shared with Doncaster)
 Donburn
 Donvale 3111
 Park Orchards 3114
 Templestowe 3106
 Serpells
 Templestowe Lower 3107
 Macedon
 Templestowe Heights
 Templestowe West
 Warrandyte 3113
 Goldfields/West End
 Pound Bend
 Warrandyte South 3134
 Wonga Park 3115
 Nunawading 3131 (Shared with City of Whitehorse)
 Ringwood North 3134 (Shared with City of Maroondah)

City of Maroondah
 Bayswater North 3153
 Croydon 3136
 Burnt Bridge
 Nelsons Hill
 Clifford Park
 Croydon Hills 3136
 Croydon North 3136
 Croydon South 3136
 Heathmont 3135
 Eastwood
 Kilsyth 3137
 Kilsyth South 3137
 Park Orchards 3114
 Ringwood 3134
 Heathwood
 Cherrydene
 Ringwood East 3135
 Bedford Road
 Ringwood North 3134 (Shared with City of Manningham)
 Vermont 3133
 Warranwood 3134
 Norwood
 Wonga Park 3115

City of Whitehorse

 Blackburn 3130
 Laburnum (the name of the railway station)
 Bellbird
 Blackburn North 3130
 Blackburn South 3130
 Kinkuna
 Box Hill 3128
 Box Hill Central
 Box Hill North 3129
 Kerrimuir
 Koonung
 Mont Albert North 3129
 Box Hill South 3128
 Houston
 Burwood 3125 (Shared with City of Monash)
 Bennettswood
 Surrey Hills South
 Wattle Park
 Burwood East 3151
 Burwood Heights
 Tally Ho
 Forest Hill 3131
 Brentford Square
 Mitcham 3132
 Heatherdale (the name of the railway station)
 Rangeview
 Mont Albert 3127 (Shared with City of Boroondara)
 Nunawading 3131 (Shared with City of Manningham)
 Parkmore
 Tunstall
 Surrey Hills 3127 (Shared with City of Boroondara)
 Vermont 3133
 Vermont Estate
 Vermont West
 Vermont South 3133

Shire of Yarra Ranges

Suburbs
 Belgrave 3160
 Belgrave Heights 3160
 Belgrave South 3160
 Chirnside Park 3116
 Black Springs
 Kilsyth 3137
 Lilydale 3140
 Montrose 3765
 Mooroolbark 3138
 Mount Evelyn 3796
 Mckillop
 Selby 3159
 Tecoma 3160
 Upper Ferntree Gully 3156 (mainly in the City of Knox)
 Upwey 3158

Towns, townships and rural localities
 Badger Creek 3777
 Beenak 3139
 Basan Corner
 Big Pats Creek 3799
 Cambarville 3779
 Fifteen Mile
 Kel Junction
 Montys Hut
 Shaw
 The Triangle
 Chum Creek 3777
 Healesville
 Coldstream 3770
 Coldstream West
 Dixons Creek 3775
 Don Valley 3139
Emerald (part), 3782
 Fernshaw 3778
 Ferny Creek 3786
 One Tree Hill
 Gilderoy 3797
 Gladysdale 3797
 Saint Benedicts
 Gruyere 3770
 Cahillton, a former name
 Yeringberg
 Healesville 3777
 Tims Corner
 Hoddles Creek 3139
 Kallista 3791
 Beagleys Bridge
 Sassafras South
 Kalorama 3766
 Launching Place 3139
 Lysterfield 3156 (shared City of Knox where there is suburban development)
 Macclesfield 3782
 McMahons Creek 3799
 Matlock 3723 (Shared with Shire of Mansfield)
 Menzies Creek 3159 (Shared with Shire of Cardinia)
 Millgrove 3799
 Monbulk 3793
 Nathania Springs
 Mount Dandenong 3767
 Mount Toolebewong 3777
 Narre Warren East 3804
 Olinda 3788
 Harmony Vale
 Powelltown 3797
 Black Sands
 Erreys
 Nayook West
 Quongup
 Reefton 3799
 Upper Yarra Dam
 Sassafras 3787
 Sassafras Gully
 Seville 3139
 Seville East 3139
 Killara
 Sherbrooke 3789
 Silvan 3795
 Burleigh
 Silvan South
 Steels Creek 3775
 Tarrawarra 3775
 The Patch 3792 
 Three Bridges 3797
 Toolangi 3777 (Shared with Shire of Murrindindi)
 Toorongo 3833
 Tremont 3785
 Wandin East 3139
 Wandin North 3139
 Wandin Yallock
 Warburton 3799
 Old Warburton
 Warburton East 3799
 Wesburn 3799
 Britannia Creek
 Tarrango
 Woori Yallock 3139
Wonga park (part), 3115
 Yarra Glen 3775
 Tanana
 Yarra Junction 3797
 Yellingbo 3139
 Parslow, a former name 
 Yering 3770

Southeastern municipalities and their suburbs

City of Bayside
 Beaumaris 3193
 Black Rock 3193
 Black Rock North
 Half Moon Bay
 Ricketts Point
 Brighton 3186
 Dendy
 Were Street
 Brighton Beach (the name of the railway station)
 Brighton North (the name of the railway station)
 Middle Brighton (the name of the railway station)
 Brighton East 3187
 North Road
 Cheltenham 3192 (Shared with City of Kingston) 
 Southland Centre
 Pennydale
 Hampton 3188
 Castlefield
 Hampton East 3188
 Highett 3190 (Shared with City of Kingston) 
 Sandringham 3191

Shire of Cardinia

Suburbs
 Beaconsfield 3807
Emerald 3782
 Lakeside
Nobelius
Officer 3809
Officer South
Pakenham 3810
 Toomuc Valley

Towns, townships and rural localities
 Avonsleigh 3782
 Bayles 3981
 Yallock
 Beaconsfield Upper 3808
 Cations
 Bunyip 3815
 Bunyip North 3815
 Caldermeade 3984
 Cardinia 3978
 Lisbaun
 Catani 3981
 Clematis 3782
 Cockatoo 3781
 Fielder
 Wright
 Cora Lynn 3814
 Dalmore 3981
 Dewhurst 3809
 Garfield 3814
 Garfield North 3814
 Gembrook 3783
 Cornucopia
 Gilwell Park
 Whites Corner
 Guys Hill 3807
 Heath Hill 3981 (shared Shire of Baw Baw)
 Iona 3815
 Koo Wee Rup 3981
 Dalmore East
 Koo Wee Rup North 3891
 Lang Lang 3984
 Lang Lang East 3894
 Longwarry 3816 (shared Shire of Baw Baw)
 Maryknoll 3812
 Menzies Creek 3159 (shared Shire of Yarra Ranges)
 Modella 3816 (shared Shire of Baw Baw)
 Monomeith 3984
 Mount Burnett 3781
 Nangana 3781
 Nar Nar Goon 3812
 Nar Nar Goon North 3812
 Nyora 3987 (shared South Gippsland Shire and Shire of Baw Baw)
 Officer South 3809
 Pakenham South 3810
 Pakenham Upper 3810
 Rythdale 3810
 Tonimbuk 3815
 Tooradin North 3977
 Tynong 3813
 Tynong North 3813
 Vervale 3814
 Yannathan 3894

City of Casey

Suburbs
 Beaconsfield 3807
 Berwick 3806
 Botanic Ridge 3977
 Clyde 3978
 Clyde North 3978
 Cranbourne 3977
 Cranbourne East 3977
 Cranbourne North 3977
 Merinda Park (the name of the railway station)
 Cranbourne West 3977
 Cranbourne South 3977
 Centreville
 Brompton (name of the estate)
 Doveton 3177
 Endeavour Hills 3802
 Eumemmerring 3177
 Hallam 3803
 Hampton Park 3976
 Junction Village 3977
 Lyndhurst 3975
 Lynbrook 3975
 Narre Warren 3805
 Narre Warren North 3804
 Narre Warren South 3805

Townships and rural localities

 Blind Bight 3980
 Cannons Creek 3977
 Devon Meadows 3977
 Fiveways
 Harkaway 3806
 Lysterfield South 3156
 Pearcedale 3912 (shared with the Shire of Mornington Peninsula)
 Tooradin 3980
 Warneet 3980
 Chinaman Island

City of Greater Dandenong

Suburbs
 Dandenong 3175
 Cleeland
 Dunearn
 Dandenong East
 Dandenong Plaza
 Oakwood Park
 Dandenong North 3175
 Lyndale
 Dandenong South 3175
 Northern & Central Keysborough 3173
 Parkmore
 Noble Park 3174
 Harrisfield
 Noble Park East
 Yarraman
 Noble Park North 3174
 Springvale 3171
 Sandown Park (the name of the railway station)
 Springvale South 3172

Rural localities
 Lyndhurst 3975 (shared with City of Casey where there is suburban development)
 Bangholme 3175
 Southern Keysborough 3173

City of Frankston

Suburbs
 Carrum Downs 3201
 Frankston 3199
 Eliza Heights
 Frankston East
 Frankston Heights
 Karingal
 Leawarra (the name of the railway station)
 Long Island
 Mile Bridge
 Mount Erin
 Olivers Hill
 Frankston North 3200
 Pines Forest
 Frankston South 3199
 Baden Powell
 Central Langwarrin 3910
 Gateway (name of the shopping centre)
 Seaford 3198
 Belvedere Park
 Kananook

Rural locality
 Northern & Southern Langwarrin 3910
 Langwarrin North
 Langwarrin South 3911
 Skye 3977
 Lyndhurst South, former name
 Skye Valley (name of the estate)
 Sandhurst 3977
 Sandarra Estate

City of Glen Eira
 Bentleigh 3204
 Patterson (the name of the railway station)
 Bentleigh East 3165
 Coatesville
 Eastmoor
 Brighton East 3187 (shared with City of Bayside)
 Carnegie 3163
 Caulfield 3162
 Caulfield East 3145
 Caulfield North 3161
 Caulfield Junction
 Crimea
 Caulfield South 3162
 Hopetoun Gardens
 Elsternwick 3185
 Gardenvale 3185
 Gardenvale West
 Glen Huntly 3163
 Booran Road
 McKinnon 3204
 Murrumbeena 3163
 Beauville
 Ormond 3204
 Ormond East
 St Kilda East 3183 (shared with City of Port Phillip)

City of Kingston
 Aspendale 3195
 Aspendale Gardens 3195
 Bonbeach 3196
 Braeside 3195
 Carrum 3197
 Chelsea 3196
 Chelsea Heights 3196
 Cheltenham 3192 (Shared with City of Bayside) 
 Cheltenham East
 Cheltenham North
 Clarinda 3169
 Clayton South 3169
 Westall (the name of the railway station)
 Dingley Village 3172
 Dingley
 Heathen Hill
 Edithvale 3196
 Heatherton 3202
 Highett 3190 (Shared with City of Bayside) 
 Mentone 3194
 Charman
 Mentone East
 Moorabbin 3189
 Moorabbin East
 Wishart
 Moorabbin Airport 3194
 Mordialloc 3195
 Mordialloc North
 Parkdale 3195
 Patterson Lakes 3197
 Patterson Gardens
 Waterways 3195

City of Monash

 Ashwood 3147
 Stocksville
 Burwood 3125 (Shared with City of Whitehorse)
 Chadstone 3148
 Jordanville South
 Clayton 3168
 Clayton North
 Petersville
 Westerfield
 Whitburn
 Glen Waverley 3150
 Brentwood
 Syndal (the name of the railway station)
 Syndal East
 Hughesdale 3166
 Huntingdale 3166
 Monash University 3800
 Mount Waverley 3149
 Bayview
 Highbury View
 Jordanville (the name of the railway station. Prior to the creation of the Monash Council in the 1990s, this area was previously a suburb)
 Pinewood
 Mulgrave 3170
 Monashville
 Mulgrave East
 Mulgrave North
 Valewood
 Waverley Gardens
 Waverley Park
 Notting Hill 3168
 Oakleigh 3166
 Oakleigh East 3166
 Oakleigh South 3167
 Moorleigh
 Wheelers Hill 3150
 Brandon Park
 Jells Park

Shire of Mornington Peninsula

Suburbs adjacent to Port Phillip

 Blairgowrie 3942
 Capel Sound 3940
 Dromana 3936
 Moats Corner
 McCrae 3938
 Dromana Lighthouse
 Dromana West
 Mornington 3931
 Beleura Hill
 Fishermans Beach
 Tanti Park
 Mount Eliza 3930
 Canadian Bay
 Daveys Bay
 Kunyung
 Raneleigh
 Mount Martha 3934
 Balcombe
 Maryport
 Osborne
 Martha Cove (shared with Safety Beach)
 Portsea 3944
 Point Nepean
 Quarantine Station
 Rosebud 3939
 Peninsular Gardens
 Rosebud Plaza
 Rosebud South
 Rye 3941
 Tyrone
 Safety Beach 3936
 Martha Cove (shared with Mt Martha)
 St Andrews Beach 3941
 Sorrento 3943
 Koonya
 Tootgarook 3941

Suburbs adjacent to Westernport
 Bittern 3918
 Crib Point 3919
 Stony Point (the name of the railway station)
 Hastings 3915
 Old Tyabb
 Somerville 3912
 Bembridge
 "Pearcedale"
 Tyabb 3913
 Tyabb East

Townships and rural localities
 Arthurs Seat 3936
 Dromana South
 Balnarring 3926
 Balnarring North
 Balnarring Beach 3926
 Baxter 3911
 Boneo 3939
 Cape Schanck 3939
 Fingal 3939
 Gunnamatta
 Flinders 3929
 Blackberry Corner
 HMAS Cerberus 3920
 Main Ridge 3928
 Merricks 3916
 Merricks Beach 3926
 Merricks North 3926
 Foxeys Hangout
 Moorooduc 3933
 Point Leo 3916
 Red Hill 3937
 Red Hill South 3937
 Shoreham 3916
 Somers 3927
 Balnarring East
 Tuerong 3915
 Hastings West
 Moorooduc South
 Pearcedale 3912 (shared with the City of Casey)

Naval Base
 HMAS Cerberus 3920

City of Stonnington

 Armadale 3143
 Armadale North
 Glen Iris 3146 (Shared with City of Boroondara) 
 Gardiner (the name of the railway station)
 Kooyong 3144
 Malvern (/ˈmɔːlvən/) 3144
 Malvern North
 Tooronga (the name of the railway station)
 Malvern East 3145
 Central Park
 Darling (the name of the railway station)
 Darling South
 Holmesglen (the name of the railway station)
 Wattletree Road
 Prahran (/pɛ'ræn/) 3181
 South Yarra 3141 (Shared City of Melbourne)
 Hawksburn (the name of the railway station)
 Toorak 3142
 Windsor 3181

Western municipalities and their suburbs

City of Brimbank
 Albanvale 3021
 Albion 3020
 Ardeer 3022
 Brooklyn 3012 (Shared with City of Hobsons Bay)
 Cairnlea 3023
 Calder Park 3037
 Deer Park 3023
 Delahey 3037
 Derrimut 3026
 Hillside 3037 (Shared with City of Melton)
 Kealba 3021
 Keilor 3036 (Shared with City of Hume) 
 Brimbank
 Keilor Downs 3038
 Keilor East 3033 (Shared with City of Moonee Valley) 
 Keilor Lodge 3038
 Keilor North 3036
 Sydenham Park
 Keilor Park 3042
 Kings Park 3021
 St Albans 3021
 St Albans East 
 St Albans South
 Sunshine 3020
 Sunshine North 3020
 Sunshine West 3020
 Ardeer South
 Glengala
 Sydenham 3037
 Taylors Lakes 3038
 Robertson
 Watergardens (the name of the railway station)
 Tullamarine 3043 (shared with the Cities of Hume and Merri-bek)

City of Hobsons Bay
 Altona 3018
 Altona Meadows 3028
 Laverton South
 Altona North 3025
 Altona East
 Altona Gate
 Brooklyn 3012 (Shared with City of Brimbank) 
 Laverton 3028 (Shared with City of Wyndham) 
 Newport 3015
 Spotswood 3015
 Seabrook 3028
 Seaholme 3018
 South Kingsville 3015
 Williamstown 3016
 Williamstown Beach (the name of the railway station)
 Williamstown North 3016

City of Maribyrnong
 Braybrook 3019
 Footscray 3011
 Kingsville 3012
 Maidstone 3012
 Maribyrnong 3032
 Seddon 3011
 Tottenham 3012
 West Footscray 3012
 Yarraville 3013

City of Melton
 Aintree
 Bonnie Brook
 Brookfield 3338
 Burnside 3023
 Burnside Heights 3023
 Caroline Springs 3023
 Cobblebank
 Deanside
 Diggers Rest 3427, a township
 The Gap
 Exford 3338
 Eynesbury 3338 (shared with City of Wyndham) 
 Fieldstone
 Fraser Rise
 Grangefields
 Harkness
 Hillside 3037 (Shared with City of Brimbank)
 Kurunjang 3337
 Melton 3337
 Melton South 3338
 Melton West 3337
 Westmelton
 Mount Cottrell 3024 (shared with City of Wyndham) 
 Chartwell
 Parwan 3340 (shared with Shire of Moorabool) 
 Plumpton 3335
 Sydenham West
 Ravenhall 3023
 Rockbank 3335
 Strathtulloh
 Taylors Hill
 Thornhill Park
 Toolern Vale 3337
 Truganina 3029 (shared with City of Wyndham where there is suburban development)
 Weir Views

City of Moonee Valley 

Aberfeldie 3040
Airport West 3042
Ascot Vale 3032
 Ascot Vale West
Avondale Heights 3034
Essendon 3040
 Glenbervie (the name of the railway station)
Cross Keys
Essendon Fields 3041
Essendon North 3041
Essendon West 3040
Flemington, Victoria 3031 (Shared with City of Melbourne)
Newmarket  (the name of the railway station)
Keilor East 3033 (Shared with City of Brimbank)
Lincolnville
Moonee Ponds 3039
Niddrie 3042
Strathmore 3041
Strathmore Heights 3041
Travancore 3032

City of Wyndham

Suburbs
 Hoppers Crossing 3029
 Laverton West
 Laverton 3028 (Shared with the City of Hobsons Bay)
 Laverton North 3026
 Manor Lakes 3024
 Point Cook 3030
 Sanctuary Lakes
 Tarneit 3029
 Truganina 3029 (shared with Shire of Melton)
 Werribee 3030
 Brophys Crossing
 Mossfield
 Werribee South 3030
 Williams Landing 3027
 Williams RAAF
 Wyndham Vale 3024

Rural localities

 Cocoroc 3030
 Eynesbury 3338 (Shared with the Shire of Melton)
 Little River 3211 (Shared with the City of Greater Geelong)
 Manor
 Mambourin 3024
 Mount Cottrell 3024 (shared with Shire of Melton)
 Quandong 3340

See also
Cadastral divisions of Victoria
Local Government Areas of Victoria
List of localities in Victoria (Australia)
List of Melbourne railway stations
List of Melbourne tram routes
List of Melbourne bus routes

References

External links
 Secret suburbs are popping up all over the place (The Age, 3 October 2007)
 Melbourne Suburbs Profile
 Melbourne City Council Suburbs Map
Map of Greater Melbourne Suburbs
 Victorian Places
 Towns near Melbourne 

Lists of suburbs in Australia
 
Suburbs